The Hodgeman County Courthouse, at 500 Main St. in Jetmore, Kansas, was built in 1929.  It was designed and built by Routledge & Hertz of Hutchinson, Kansas in an "eclectic interpretation" of Second Renaissance Revival style.  It was listed on the National Register of Historic Places in 2002.

According to its 2001 NRHP nomination, it is the most prominent building in the town of Jetmore.  It replaced an 1886 courthouse building on the same site.

References

External links 

Courthouses on the National Register of Historic Places in Kansas
Renaissance Revival architecture in Kansas
Government buildings completed in 1929
County courthouses in Kansas
Buildings and structures in Hodgeman County, Kansas
National Register of Historic Places in Hodgeman County, Kansas